Stephen William Barlow (born 30 June 1954) is an English conductor, principally of opera. He was Artistic Director of the Buxton Festival from 2012 to 2018.
 
Barlow was a chorister at Canterbury Cathedral before studying at King's School, Canterbury, then moving to Trinity College, Cambridge, where he was an Organ Scholar.  In 1986 he married the actress Joanna Lumley, with whom he lives with in London.

He composed the opera King, the story of Thomas Becket and Henry II of England, which had its world premiere in Canterbury Cathedral in April 2006. He has worked with the opera company Helios Collective on several projects. He composed a piece for Salon Russe at the National Gallery in 2016 and spoke as part of their Formations Masterclass series in 2017.

He was awarded the honorary degree of Doctor of Music (D.Mus) for outstanding contributions to the arts by the University of Chester on 15 March 2019.

In 2019 he appeared on Laura-Jane Foley's podcast 'My Favourite Work of Art' and chose F.L Griggs' 'The Almonry' as his chosen work of art.

Barlow's wife Joanna Lumley has said that the couple live independent lives and when they are away from each other for work they do not telephone each other. Barlow is the step-father to Lumley's son Jamie.

Discography

Composer 
Rainbow Bear (with the Orchestra of Opera North, Joanna Lumley – narrator), Decca (2005)
English Love (with Mark Stone – baritone), Stone Records (2008)

Conductor 
Rainbow Bear (with the Orchestra of Opera North, Joanna Lumley – narrator), Decca (2005)
Joseph James' Requiem (2020)

Pianist 
The complete Delius songbook – volume 2 (with Mark Stone – baritone), Stone Records (2011)
The complete Delius songbook – volume 1 (with Mark Stone – baritone), Stone Records (2011)
The complete Butterworth songbook (with Mark Stone – baritone), Stone Records (2010)
English Love (with Mark Stone – baritone), Stone Records (2008)
The complete Quilter songbook Vol.I (with Mark Stone – baritone), Sony BMG (2007)

References

External links 
 Biography and other information on agent's website

1954 births
Living people
People educated at The King's School, Canterbury
Alumni of Trinity College, Cambridge
English composers
People from Canterbury
Musicians from London
English classical organists
British male organists
Musicians from Kent
English conductors (music)
British male conductors (music)
21st-century British conductors (music)
21st-century organists
21st-century British male musicians
Male classical organists